Sammy Fain (born Samuel E. Feinberg; June 17, 1902 – December 6, 1989) was an American composer of popular music. In the 1920s and early 1930s, he contributed numerous songs that form part of The Great American Songbook, and to Broadway theatre.  Fain was also a popular musician and vocalist.

Biography
Sammy Fain was born in New York City, New York, United States, the son of a cantor.  In 1923, Fain appeared in the short sound film, "Sammy Fain and Artie Dunn" directed by Lee De Forest filmed in DeForest's Phonofilm sound-on-film process. In 1925, Fain left the Fain-Dunn act to devote himself to music. Fain was a self-taught pianist who played by ear. He began working as a staff pianist and composer for music publisher Jack Mills. In 1932 he appeared in the short film "The Crooning Composer."  

Later, Fain worked extensively in collaboration with Irving Kahal. Together they wrote classics such as "Let a Smile Be Your Umbrella" and "You Brought a New Kind of Love to Me," (co-written with Pierre Norman) and "I'll Be Seeing You." Another lyricist who collaborated with Fain was Lew Brown, with whom he wrote "That Old Feeling". His Broadway credits also include Everybody's Welcome, Right This Way, Hellzapoppin', Flahooley, Ankles Aweigh, Christine and Something More.

Film works
Fain also composed music for more than 30 films in the 1930s, 1940s and 1950s. He was nominated for the best Academy Award for Best Original Song ten times, winning twice, with "Secret Love" from Calamity Jane in 1954 and with "Love Is a Many-Splendored Thing" from the movie of the same title in 1956. He co-wrote both songs with Paul Francis Webster, another long-time collaborator. Fain wrote the second theme to the TV series Wagon Train in 1958, which was called "(Roll Along) Wagon Train". He also contributed to the song scores for the Walt Disney animated films Alice in Wonderland, Peter Pan, and The Rescuers (the latter, soon to be his last effort, also earned him another Oscar nomination).

In 1963, he collaborated with Harold Adamson, in writing songs for the film The Incredible Mr. Limpet, which came out in 1964, and such songs as "I Wish I Were a Fish", "Be Careful How You Wish" and "Deep Rapture" enhanced his fame.

Recognition
In 1972, he was inducted into The Songwriters Hall of Fame.

Death
Fain died from a heart attack in Los Angeles, California, and is interred at Cedar Park Cemetery, in Emerson, New Jersey.

Work on Broadway
Everybody's Welcome (1931) - musical - composer
Right This Way (1938) - musical - featured songwriter for "I'll Be Seeing You"
Hellzapoppin' (1938) - revue - co-composer and co-lyricist
George White's Scandals of 1939 (1939) - revue - composer
Boys and Girls Together (1940) - revue - composer
Sons o' Fun (1941) - revue - co-composer and co-lyricist
Toplitzky of Notre Dame (1946) - musical - composer
Alive and Kicking (1950) - revue - co-composer
Flahooley (1951) - musical - composer
Ankles Aweigh (1955) - musical - composer
Catch a Star (1955) - revue - co-composer
Ziegfeld Follies of 1957 (1957) - revue - featured songwriter for "An Element of Doubt"
Christine (1960) - musical - composer
Something More! (1964) - musical - composer
Rock 'N Roll! The First 5,000 Years (1982) - revue - featured songwriter for "Love Is a Many-Splendored Thing"
Swing! (1999) - revue - featured songwriter for "I'll Be Seeing You"
Calamity Jane (2018) - musical - composer (first full staging in the NYC area)

References

External links

 Sammy Fain recordings at the Discography of American Historical Recordings

1902 births
1989 deaths
20th-century American composers
20th-century American male musicians
American male composers
American musical theatre composers
Best Original Song Academy Award-winning songwriters
Broadway composers and lyricists
Burials at Cedar Park Cemetery (Emerson, New Jersey)
Jewish American composers
Jewish American songwriters
Musicians from New York City
Songwriters from New York (state)
Walt Disney Animation Studios people